Washilly Tshibasu (born 25 February 1990 in Belgium) is a Belgian footballer.

References

Belgian footballers
Living people
1990 births
Association football midfielders
Belgian expatriate footballers
Expatriate footballers in Finland
Royal Antwerp F.C. players
Oulun Palloseura players
Kokkolan Palloveikot players
Kemi City F.C. players
FF Jaro players